Gunar Kirchbach (born 12 October 1971) is a German sprint canoer who competed in the mid-to-late 1990s. He won a gold medal in the C-2 1000 m event at the 1996 Summer Olympics, together with teammate Andreas Dittmer.

Kirchbach also won five medals at the ICF Canoe Sprint World Championships with two golds (C-2 1000 m: 1994, 1997) and three bronzes (C-2 500 m: 1993, 1995; C-2 1000 m: 1995).

References
Database Olympics.com profile

1971 births
Canoeists at the 1996 Summer Olympics
German male canoeists
Living people
Olympic canoeists of Germany
Olympic gold medalists for Germany
Olympic medalists in canoeing
ICF Canoe Sprint World Championships medalists in Canadian
Medalists at the 1996 Summer Olympics